Katsiaryna Shumak (born 29 October 1988) is a retired Belarusian sprinter.

In the 4 × 100 metres relay she finished sixth at the 2009 European U23 Championships and fourth at the 2010 European Championships. At the 2009 European U23 Championships she also reached the semi-final of the individual 100 metres.

Her personal best times were 7.40 seconds in the 60 metres (indoors), achieved in January 2011 in Mogilyov; 11.40 seconds in the 100 metres, achieved in June 2010 in Grodno; and 24.05 seconds in the 200 metres, achieved in May 2011 in Brest.

References

1988 births
Living people
Belarusian female sprinters